James Roberson may refer to:
James Roberson (American football), American football player
James Roberson (politician), member of the North Carolina House of Representatives
Lake Roberson (James Lake Roberson Jr.), American football player